In mathematics, the Hilbert–Speiser theorem is a result on cyclotomic fields, characterising those with a normal integral basis.

Hilbert–Speiser Theorem.

This is the condition that it should be a subfield of  where  is a squarefree odd number.

In cases where the theorem states that a normal integral basis does exist, such a basis may be constructed by means of Gaussian periods. For a field  contained in it, the field trace can be used to construct such a basis in  also (see the article on Gaussian periods). Then in the case of  squarefree and odd,  is a compositum of subfields of this type for the primes  dividing  (this follows from a simple argument on ramification). This decomposition can be used to treat any of its subfields.

 proved a converse to the Hilbert–Speiser theorem:

Each finite tamely ramified abelian extension  of a fixed number field  has a relative normal integral basis if and only if .

It is now called the Srivastav-Taylor theorem .

References

Cyclotomic fields
Theorems in algebraic number theory